Woodman is a planned light rail station on the Los Angeles County Metro Rail system. The station is part of the East San Fernando Light Rail Project and planned to open in 2028. It is located on Van Nuys Boulevard at the intersection with Woodman Boulevard in the Arleta neighborhood of Los Angeles. The station features a single island platform in the median strip on the northeast leg of the crossroads.

References

Future Los Angeles Metro Rail stations
Railway stations scheduled to open in 2028
Arleta, Los Angeles